Nettleden is a village and former civil parish, now in the parish of Nettleden with Potten End, in the  Dacorum district, in the county of Hertfordshire, England. It is in the Chiltern Hills, about four miles north-west of Hemel Hempstead, near Little Gaddesden, Great Gaddesden and Frithsden. In 1931 the parish had a population of 133.

Etymology
The village name of Nettleden is Anglo-Saxon in origin and means 'valley where nettles grow'. In manorial records of the late twelfth century the village was recorded as Neteleydene.

History
Historically, Nettleden was a hamlet in the parish of Pitstone in Buckinghamshire, although the boundary of the hamlet was almost surrounded by the county of Hertfordshire. Nettleden was included in the Berkhamsted Poor Law Union from 1835. As Nettleden had its own overseer of the poor, it was deemed to be a separate civil parish from 10 August 1866 under the Poor Law Amendment Act 1866. When district councils were established in December 1894, Nettleden was included in the Berkhamsted Rural District, which was temporarily allowed to straddle Hertfordshire and Buckinghamshire pending Nettleden being transferred to Hertfordshire, which happened on 30 September 1895.

The church, St Lawrence, was first mentioned in 1285 when it became a part of the endowment of Ashridge Monastery. The church, except for the tower, was largely rebuilt in brick by John, Earl of Bridgewater, in 1811. Until 1895 it was a chapelry of Pitstone.

The hamlet of St Margaret's, formerly belonging to Ivinghoe in Buckinghamshire, was added to the parish of Nettleden in 1895 at the same time as the county boundary change. Here, Henry de Blois, bishop of Winchester, founded the nunnery of St Margaret's de Bosco. After the Dissolution in 1539, St Margaret's came into private hands. During the Second World War, St Margaret's Camp was a London County Council senior school for evacuee boys from London. The school closed one week after the end of the war in Europe, when all the boys were returned to their homes in London. Since 1984 it has been the Amaravati Buddhist Monastery.

On 1 April 1937 the civil parish of Nettleden was abolished, joining with parts of the parishes of Great Berkhampstead Rural and Northchurch to form a new parish called Nettleden with Potten End.

From Nettleden to Frithsden runs the Roman Road or Spooky Lane, named in reference to the ghost of an Ashridge monk. In the early 19th century, the lane was dug deeper into the hill, with high revetted walls on both sides, and a bridge was built over the lane, in order that people using the driveway leading to Ashridge did not meet the villagers. Another feature of Nettleden is the steep Pipers Hill to the east of the village.

References

External links

Nettleden (A Guide to Old Hertfordshire)
Nettleden (British-History)
Nettleden Conservation Area -  Character Appraisal& Management Proposals

Villages in Hertfordshire
Former civil parishes in Hertfordshire
Dacorum